2nd Iranian Majlis was commenced on 15 November 1909 and ended on 25 December 1911. It "moved in the same direction as its predecessor [a reformist and nationalist parliament], reorganising the state bureaucracy, but passing laws on education, health and taxation as well. When it rejected an ultimatum from the Russian Empire, it too was dissolved in December 1911."

References

2nd term of the Iranian Majlis